Ramal da Mina da Nogueirinha is a closed railway branch in Portugal, which connected the station of Casa Branca, on the current Linha do Alentejo, to the Nogueirinha mine.

See also 
 List of railway lines in Portugal
 History of rail transport in Portugal

References

Railway lines in Portugal
Iberian gauge railways